The ITF Women's Circuit is the second-tier tour for women's professional tennis organised by the International Tennis Federation, and is the tier below the WTA Tour. In 2001, the ITF Women's circuit included tournaments with prize money ranging from $10,000 to $75,000. In addition to the traditional tournament format, there were also two four-week circuits (in Australia and Mexico) worth $40,000 each in prize money and two four-week development circuits (both held in India) each worth $20,000.

The ITF world champions for 2001 were Jennifer Capriati (senior singles), Lisa Raymond / Rennae Stubbs (senior doubles), Svetlana Kuznetsova (junior singles) and Petra Cetkovská (junior doubles).

Schedule

Key

January

February

March

Tournament breakdown by region

Including Central America and the Caribbean

Singles titles by nation

This list displays only the top 20 nations in singles titles wins.

References

External links
International Tennis Federation (ITF) official website

 
ITF Women's World Tennis Tour
ITF Circuit
2001 in women's tennis